Callisemaea elegans is a species of plants in the family Fabaceae. It is found in Mesoamerica.

References

External links 

 
 Callisemaea elegans at Tropicos

Fabaceae
Plants described in 1843